Edmund Paris Paul (4 February 1882 – 26 April 1966) played first-class cricket for Somerset in four matches between 1907 and 1910. He was born and died at Taunton, Somerset.

Paul was a right-handed batsman and a wicketkeeper, though in one match he played in for Somerset in the 1910 season he did not keep wicket. He made only 37 runs in eight first-class innings and took just two catches.

References

1882 births
1966 deaths
English cricketers
Somerset cricketers
Sportspeople from Taunton